Christophe Freyss (born 30 August 1956) is a former professional tennis player from France.

Freyss achieved a career-high singles ranking of world No. 82 in 1980.

ATP career finals

Singles runners-up (2)

Doubles runners-up (1)

External links
 
 

French male tennis players
Sportspeople from Strasbourg
1956 births
Living people